The Samurai Jack comics was a monthly American comic book series chronicling the travels of Samurai Jack, the protagonist of the eponymous series on Cartoon Network. The comic book series follows up on Season 4 of Samurai Jack, which tells of an unnamed, time-displaced feudal Japanese samurai prince, who takes the name "Jack", in his singular quest to find a method of travelling back in time and defeating the tyrannical demon Aku.

In February 2013, IDW Publishing announced a partnership with Cartoon Network to produce comics based on its properties. Samurai Jack was one of the titles announced to be published. It was further announced at WonderCon 2013 that the first issue of Samurai Jack will debut in October 2013.  The first comic in the series was released October 23, 2013.

Nine years after Genndy Tartakovsky's series was put on hiatus, and just a few years before Adult Swim launched its concluding season, IDW Publishing had announced a new comic book featuring the continuing adventures of Jack, the temporally displaced warrior and his epic quest to destroy Aku. Beginning with a five-issue storyline called Rope of Eons. Suriano, who designed characters for the show, reflected on returning to the popular character via press release: "Returning to Samurai Jack is such a personal experience and labor of love for me. It's like stepping through a time portal back to characters I know as friends and a world that really launched my animation career".

The first volume, which contained Issues 1–5, was released in May 2014. It was made available as both a hard copy and an eBook with a total of 120 pages. Volume 2, "The Scotsman's Curse", contains issues 6-10 and was released 28 October 2014. Volume 3, which highlighted the "Quest for the Broken Blade" (Issues 11-15), was officially released on March 31, 2015. Volume 4; "The Warrior King", concluding issues 16–20, was released on September 1, 2015.  Over a year later, IDW released a full omnibus compilation of all 20 issues, titled Samurai Jack: Tales of the Wandering Warrior, on October 25, 2016.

In January 2015, Jim Zub, creator of the Samurai Jack comic series, confirmed that the issues would be concluded with issue #20, in May 2015. He went on to state that "Working on Jack has been a project that felt just as creative and expansive as any creator-owned work I've done. Almost every single idea we pitched was enthusiastically approved by IDW and Cartoon Network. We told the stories we wanted to tell the way we wanted to tell them and, from everything I've seen and the people I've met, the fans thoroughly enjoyed them too. That's a rare and wonderful thing and I won't take it for granted." Zub wanted fans to feel that, with the comics, there is a sense of closure to the series. "In the third season of Samurai Jack there's an episode called 'Jack and Travelling Creatures' where, after trials and tribulations aplenty, we catch a glimpse of a possible future for our wandering hero; we see Jack as an older Warrior-King, a veteran of an untold number of conflicts". Zub stated that the team is "embracing that awesome vision of Jack in a very heartfelt done-in-one story called 'Mako the Scribe'." Tartakovsky does not consider the comics to be part of the story of Samurai Jack.

On 8 May 2019, IDW Publishing released the first series of the Samurai Jack: Lost Worlds comic series. The story looks at how society has prospered under the leadership of the benevolent Samurai Jack and everything is in line with his philosophies after the events of Tales of the Wandering Warrior. On 20 November 2019, Samurai Jack: Lost Worlds was compiled into compendium of the four-part series. The story was produced by Paul Allor and illustrated by Adam Bryce Thomas.

Plot

Tales of the Wandering Warrior

The series is set after the end of the fourth season. Sometime after the events of episode LII, Jack travels through a desert to find a hermit living in a cave, whom he inquires for a way to return to his own time. The hermit reveals that Aku learned his mastery of time travel through an ancient relic known as the Rope of Eons. He studied it, and absorbed its power before destroying it, so others couldn't learn its secrets, although it was possible for one to use the Rope once again if its strands were recovered and assembled together again. Jack embarks on many quests to reassemble the Rope, only to discover that the last strand was in Aku's possession. After Jack fights Aku and manages to take the last strand, Aku responds with a fierce attack that mortally wounds Jack, who is then given a choice to either fully sacrifice the Rope's power to undo the fatal blow, or die. Jack chooses the former, unwilling to lose to Aku, but is forced to escape without accomplishing his goal.

After the Rope was lost, Jack reunites with the Scotsman, only to confront a series of supernatural threats, such as the gender-bending curse of the leprechauns, a villain who can manipulate gravity and an attack on his samurai mentality and focus from Aku himself.  He later makes another bid to return to his own time by performing a magic ritual that involved a seer using the spirit of his sword to create a time travel portal, but this backfires and breaks the weapon, leaving Jack unarmed and vulnerable.  When Aku learns of the loss of Jack's sword, he stops at nothing to try and finish off Jack by any means necessary, but Jack manages to escape, stay hidden and survive without his weapon.

Quantum Jack
In 2017, months after the series was revived and finished with the fifth season, IDW Publishing released a new 5-issue miniseries called Quantum Jack, which takes place between the fourth and fifth seasons and depicts Samurai Jack hopping from one dimension to the next, searching for a way back to his original form as his honor and pride push him forward back to his own time to face Aku one last time. The first issue depicts Jack as the leader of a ruthless biker gang that ambushes a royal convoy. The second issue depicts Jack as a masked luchador. The third issue depicts Jack in a world ruled by monsters known as Krogo, where he teams up with a group of scientists that control a giant battle robot as Jack slowly starts to regain his memory. The fourth issue depicts Jack as a modern day-style business office employee working in a cubicle for Aku. The fifth and final issue finally reveals how and why Jack has been stranded in time as he makes one last gambit to return to his own time. This series was ultimately collected into a trade paperback.

Lost Worlds
In 2019, IDW Publishing released a new 4-issue miniseries called Lost Worlds, which also takes place between the fourth and fifth seasons and depicts Samurai Jack emerging from his hermetic life to discover a town ruled by a doppelganger of himself, who's determined to conquer the world and spread Jack's philosophies, teachings and beliefs. However, the two Jacks quickly clash as the true nature of the doppelganger is revealed.

Issues

Appearance in other comics
Before the IDW series, Samurai Jack comics had appeared in Cartoon Network Action Pack, published by DC Comics.

Other comics
There have been other comic book series involving Samurai Jack, besides the 20-issue series that was produced and released as an intended follow-up to the fourth season of the series.

Classic Volumes
The Classic Volumes are series of comics based on the events that happened before and during the Samurai Jack television series. The 136-page collection focuses on Jack's origin story and was released November 12, 2013. Simply put, Aku the demon wizard has enslaved Jack's people. Jack inherits a mystical katana and beats Aku in battle only to be sent far into the future where Aku's grip is all-reaching and all-powerful. Thus starts Jack's quest to journey back to his original time so he may finish what he and Aku started. The rest consists of short tales of Jack liberating others from Aku's hold, before passing along to the next town in true drifter style. The artwork for the Classic Volumes is done by Ricardo Garcia Fuentes (commonly known as Micro), who also illustrated Jack in the Cartoon Network: Action Packs comic. Volume 2 of the Classic Volumes was officially released on April 22, 2014.

Cartoon Network: Super Secret Crisis War!
Samurai Jack appears in the IDW Publishing crossover event between all of their Cartoon Network-owned properties, "Super Secret Crisis War!", which includes Ben 10: Omniverse, Dexter's Laboratory, The Powerpuff Girls, Ed, Edd n Eddy, Johnny Bravo, Cow and Chicken, Codename: Kids Next Door, Foster's Home for Imaginary Friends, and The Grim Adventures of Billy & Mandy. The crossover shows Aku teaming up with Mandark, Vilgax and Mojo Jojo to form the "League of Extraordinary Villains" and capture Ben Tennyson, Samurai Jack, Dexter, The Powerpuff Girls and (inadvertently) the Eds, as they plan to conquer the Cartoon Network multiverse and take out their mortal enemies. The series also had 5 tie-in one-shots of the League's robot minions invading the dimensions of Johnny Bravo, Foster's Home for Imaginary Friends, Cow and Chicken, Codename: Kids Next Door and The Grim Adventures of Billy & Mandy. This series was collected into two trade paperbacks.

Collected Editions

References

External links
 Samurai Jack on IDW Publishing

Comics by Jim Zub
Comics based on television series
2013 comics debuts
2019 comics endings
IDW Publishing titles
Samurai Jack
Samurai fiction